santomensis, saotomensis, santomense and saotomense are Latin adjectives meaning "pertaining to, or originating in the island of São Tomé", an island of São Tomé and Príncipe. They may refer to any of the following species:

Assiminea saotomensis, a sea snail species
Conopea saotomensis, a barnacle species
Feadillo saotomensis, an armadillo woodlice species
Mitrella saotomensis, a dove snail species
Mitromorpha saotomensis, a sea snail species
Murchisonella saotomensis, a sea snail species
Pseudechiniscus santomensis, a water bear tardigrade species
Pseudoscilla saotomensis, a pyram species
Zaprionus santomensis, a fruit fly species

Synonyms
Mitra santomensis, synonym of Mitra barbadensis